Paolo Virno (born May 14, 1952) is an Italian philosopher, semiologist and a figurehead for the Italian Marxist movement. Implicated in belonging to illegal social movements during the 1960s and 1970s, Virno was arrested and jailed in 1979, accused of belonging to the Red Brigades. He spent several years in prison before finally being acquitted, after which he organized the publication Luogo Comune (Italian for "commonplace") in order to vocalize the political ideas he developed during his imprisonment. Virno currently teaches philosophy at the University of Rome.

Biography
Virno was born in Naples, but spent his childhood and adolescence in Genoa. He had his first political experiences when joining the social movements of 1968—the association between personal fulfillment and anti-capitalism, typical of the critique artiste of the 1960s, which then constituted one of the key reasons for his political philosophy. He moved to Rome with his family at the beginning of the 1970s, where he studied philosophy in university.

Simultaneously, Virno was involved in the labour movement and campaigned in the organization Potere Operaio, a Marxist group involved in the recruitment and mobilization of industrial workers. Potere Operaio, unlike political communists of the Soviet Union and China who sought to combine the student bodies with the workers' unions, focused mainly on factory and industrial workers in a program stemming from Marx's theory criticising the organization of work. Virno participated in the movement, organizing protests and strikes in northern Italian factories, until its dissolution in 1973.

In 1977 Virno presented his doctoral thesis on the concept of work and the theory of consciousness of Theodor Adorno, while actively participating in the movement of 1977, which organized around the precariousness of workers. The Metropolitan magazine, which he founded along with Oreste Scalzone and Franco Piperno, was revered as the body of the intellectual movement at the time. Two years later, the editorial board of Metropolitan France was jailed on charges of belonging to the Red Brigades.

The three-year period of custody was a time of intense intellectual activity for Virno and others involved. After being sentenced in 1982 to 12 years in prison for "subversive activities and creation of an armed group" (though the charges of belonging to the Red Brigades did not materialise), Virno appealed and was released pending trial in the second instance; in 1987 he would eventually be acquitted, along with Piperno. His experience during these years were fed into the organization of the Luogo Comune publication, devoted to the analysis of life forms within postfordism.
In 1993 Virno left his post as editor of Luogo Comune to teach philosophy at the University of Urbino. In 1996 he was invited to talk at the University of Montreal and upon his return he held the chair of philosophy of language, semiotics and ethics of communication at the University of Cosenza (Calabria). He now teaches at the University of Rome.

Philosophical work
The early works of Virno were directly linked to his political participation, but after years of imprisonment, which along with his fellow prisoners, he conducted intensive studies of philosophy, and his focus on theoretical research has become more ambitious, covering political philosophy, linguistics and the study of mass media.

On the one hand, studies pertaining to philosophy of language have led to the confrontation of the classic themes of philosophy — like the analysis of subjectivity — with the limits imposed under linguistics. On the other hand, Virno has explored the ethical dimension of communication. The juncture of these fields was found to be a materialism that encompasses the processes of language and thought as a working link, keeping in line with the traditions of Theodor Adorno and Alfred Sohn-Rethel, the interrelationship between work, thought, language, society and history is the nexus of its philosophical thought.

The philosophical concepts, however, maintained a close link with theory and action-related policies; notions of "world", "power", "potential" or "history", which have been the focus of many of his works, were in fact conceived in key by Marx. Virno, along with many of his contemporaries such as Antonio Negri, has abandoned and argued against the hegemony of the dialectic tradition in Marxist philosophy.

Virno maintains the status of historical and linguistic concepts as being political-state, sovereignty, obedience, legality, legitimacy, which are accepted in social theory and philosophy as invariant, although polemically are considered to have been invented in the 17th century, with very specific and controversial political objectives. The reinvention of the concepts of society is part of the political task that has been proposed, regarding the concept of exodus — perhaps the best example of this joint, where the personal experiences of emotion are understood as an act of resistance toward established power and status quo. The assumption by the personality of the flight as a reaction to the social structure. On these lines, Virno has criticized these restrictions as symbolic of the counter-culture movements.

Bibliography
Italian:
Convenzione e Materialismo (1986); Roma: Ed. Theoria
 Opportunisme, Cynisme et Peur. Ambivalence du Désenchantement Suivi de les Labyrinthes de la Langue (1991); Paris-Combas: Editions de l'éclat
 Mondanità. L'idea di "Mondo" tra Esperienza Sensibile e Sfera Pubblica (1994); Roma: Ed. Manifestolibri
 Parole con parole. Poteri e Limiti del Linguaggio (1995); Roma: Donzelli
Publications in English:

 A Grammar of the Multitude. New York: Semiotext(e), 2004. ISBN  9781584350217
 Multitude: Between Innovation and Negation. New York: Semiotext(e), 2008. ISBN  1584350504
 When the Word Becomes Flesh. New York: Semiotext(e), 2015. ISBN  1584350946
 Déjà Vu and the End of History. New York: Verso Books, 2015. ISBN  1781686114
 Essay on Negation: For a Linguistic Anthropology. London/Calcutta: Seagull Books, 2018. ISBN  0857424386
 Convention and Materialism: Uniqueness without Aura. Translated by Lorenzo Chiesa. Cambridge, Mass.: MIT Press, 2021. ISBN  026204580X
 The Idea of World: Public Intellect and Use of Life. London/Calcutta: Seagull Books, 2022. ISBN  0857429892

See also 
 Autonomy
 Mario Tronti
 Antonio Negri
 Franco Berardi
 Mariarosa Dalla Costa
 Autonomist Marxism
 Counterculture

References

External links

In Castilian
 "Virtuosismo y revolución: notas sobre el concepto de acción política"
 "Virtuosismo y revolución, la acción política en la época del desencanto" (PDF)
 "Gramática de la multitud: Para un análisis de las formas de vida contemporáneas" (PDF)
 "La felicidad sigue siendo el asunto principal"
 "Ante un nuevo siglo XVII"
 "Dossier de lecturas seminario Paolo Virno" (PDF)
 Iniciando un foro sobre "Gramática...", etc.
 "Cuando el verbo se hace carne: Lenguaje y naturaleza humana", texto de Virno
 "Cuando el verbo se hace carne: Lenguaje y naturaleza humana"
 "Cuando el Verbo se Hace Carne" - P. Virno (zip)
 "El chiste y la acción innovadora"

Other languages
 "Grammatica della moltitudine:Per un’analisi delle forme di vita contemporanee"
 "Grammaire de la multitude: Pour une analyse des formes de vie contemporaines"
 "A Grammar of the Multitude: For an Analysis of Contemporary Forms of Life"
Déjà Vu and the End of History

Autonomism
1952 births
Living people
20th-century Italian philosophers
21st-century Italian philosophers
Italian communists
Italian political philosophers
Italian sociologists
Marxist theorists
Materialists
Political philosophers
Social philosophers
Academic staff of Roma Tre University
Italian philosophers
Marxian critique of political economy